Princess Helena of Nassau (18 August 183127 October 1888) was a daughter of William, Duke of Nassau, and consort of  George Victor, Prince of Waldeck and Pyrmont.

Early life
Helena was born at Wiesbaden, Duchy of Nassau. She was the ninth child of William, Duke of Nassau (1792–1839), by his second wife Princess Pauline of Württemberg (1810–1856), daughter of Prince Paul of Württemberg. She was the half-sister of Adolphe, Grand Duke of Luxembourg (then Hereditary Prince of Nassau). She was related to the Dutch Royal Family and also, distantly, to the British Royal Family through her father and mother, both were descendants of King George II of Great Britain.

Marriage and family
Princess Helena married on 26 September 1853 in Wiesbaden to George Victor, Prince of Waldeck and Pyrmont, son of George II, Prince of Waldeck and Pyrmont.

Children
They had seven children:

Princess Sophie Nikoline (27 July 1854 – 5 August 1869); died of tuberculosis at fifteen.
Princess Pauline (19 October 1855 – 3 July 1925) married Alexis, Prince of Bentheim and Steinfurt.
Princess Marie (23 May 1857 – 30 April 1882) who married Prince William, later King William II of Württemberg.
Princess Emma (2 August 1858 – 20 March 1934) who married King William III of the Netherlands. The Dutch royal family exist of descendants from this marriage.
Princess Helena (17 February 1861 – 1 September 1922) who married Prince Leopold, Duke of Albany.
Prince Friedrich (20 January 1865 – 26 May 1946), last reigning prince of Waldeck and Pyrmont, married Princess Bathildis of Schaumburg-Lippe
Princess Elisabeth (6 September 1873 – 23 November 1961) married Alexander, Prince of Erbach-Schönberg.

Grandchildren
Among her grandchildren were:
Pauline, Princess of Wied (1877–1965), the last senior member of the House of Württemberg.
Wilhelmina of the Netherlands (1880–1962), queen regnant of the Netherlands.
Princess Alice, Countess of Athlone (1883–1981), vice-regal consort of Canada.
Charles Edward, Duke of Saxe-Coburg and Gotha (1884–1954), the last reigning Duke of Saxe-Coburg and Gotha.
Josias, Hereditary Prince of Waldeck and Pyrmont (1896–1967)
George Louis, Prince of Erbach-Schönberg (1903–1971)

Ancestry

Notes and sources

The Royal House of Stuart, London, 1969, 1971, 1976, Addington, A. C., Reference: vol II page 337/347
For My Grandchildren London, 1966, Athlone, HRH Princess Alice, Countess of, Reference: Page 41 part of biographical notes

|-

1831 births
1888 deaths
People from Wiesbaden
People from the Duchy of Nassau
House of Nassau-Weilburg
House of Waldeck and Pyrmont
Princesses of Waldeck and Pyrmont
Princesses of Nassau-Weilburg
Daughters of monarchs